The 2009 WAFF U-15 Championship was the third edition of the WAFF U-15 Championship, an under-15 international tournament for member nations of the West Asian Football Federation (WAFF). It took place in Amman, Jordan from 13 to 18 August 2009, featuring 9 teams.

Participating nations
9 West Asian Federation teams entered the competition.

Venues
The competition was played in two venues in the city of Amman.

Group stage

Group A

Group B

Group C

Ranking of second-placed teams
The best runner-up team from the three groups advanced to the semi-finals along with the three group winners.

Knockout stage

Bracket

Semi-finals

Third place

Final

Champion

Statistics

Goalscorers

Source:

References

External links 
 WAFF official website

U15 2009
WAFF U-15 Championship
International association football competitions hosted by Jordan
2009 in Asian football
2009–10 in Jordanian football